Barbados National Archives are the national archives of Barbados. It is located in the northern Black Rock, St. Michael close to the University of the West Indies campus adjacent to the Usain Bolt Sports Complex. The collection includes manuscripts, letters, reports, books, maps, charts and photographs.

From 1962 to 2004, the Barbados National Archives also held the West Indies Federation Federal Archives.

See also 
 List of archives in Barbados
 List of national archives

References 

National Archives of Barbados
National Archives of Barbados
Barbados
National Archives of Barbados